Anna Cowin is a former Lake County School District superintendent and served in the Florida State Senate. A Republican representing Leesburg in the 20th District State Senate Seat, in 2004 Cowin announced that she would not seek re-election to her seat and instead would run for Lake County Superintendent of Schools. She was succeeded by Carey Baker.

Cowin was born in Brooklyn, New York. She has a BA from the College of New Rochelle in New York (1968) and an MS from Fordham University.
She authored Kayla McKean legislation (Kayla McKean Child Protection Act).

She is married and has three children.

References

External links 
 "Florida%20Photographic%20Collection"%20AND%20subjectp%3A"Cowin%2C%20Anna."&searchbox=1&query=Cowin,%20Anna.&year=&gallery=0&search-type= Anna Cowin at floridamemory.com

|-

Year of birth missing (living people)
Living people
College of New Rochelle alumni
Florida state senators
School superintendents in Florida
American women educators
Politicians from Brooklyn
People from Lake County, Florida
Women state legislators in Florida
Fordham University alumni
21st-century American women